John Gabriel Tęczyński (1484 – 21 May 1553) Chamberlain (1515) and voivode of Sandomierz (1543), Castellan (1518) and the governor of Lublin, the Speaker of the court of the Crown (1522), Castellan of Wojnicki (1535), Count of the Holy Roman Empire (1527).

Family
Born in 1485 into the Szlachta Topór coat of arms to mother Anna Konińska of Konin (d. After 25 December 1534) of the House of Tęczyński and his father Jana Konińskiego. His Grandfather was Gabriel Tęczyński (b. Approx. 1430, d. 1497) and uncles Stanislaus Tęczyński and Andrew Tęczyński (d. 1561) (b. approx. 1480), and four sisters.

His wife Dobrochna Sapieżanka h. Fox (died after 1512) was the daughter of Jana Sapiehy a royal secretary and chancellor of Queen Helena, the governor of Podlasie and Marshall of the Grand Duchy of Lithuania. They had a son Stanislav Gabriel Tęczyński (born 27 March 1514; died 5 December 1560/1561) who was Castellan  of Lviv, and provincial governor of Krakow, and a daughter Beata Tęczyńską (born c1520), whose husband was John Zabrzeziński - the son of Jan Jurjewicz Zabrzeziński. His second wife Anna was the daughter of John and Anna Buczacki.

Early life 
In his youth he studied at the Academy of Krakow and grew up at the court in Königsberg where he was a close confidant of Queen Bona; In 1510, together with his brothers and Stanislaw Andrzej he purchased half of Krasnik In 1527AD  Emperor Charles V granted him the title of Count Imperia Sacri Romani and Polish King Sigismund I made him ambassador to the kings of Hungary and Czech.

Career
A successful politician at court,  he was:
 kasztelanem (standard bearer)(1516-1518), governor (1530–1552) and  Castellan(1518–1535) for Lublin, 
 marszałkiem nadwornym (Speaker of the court) (1529–1552), 
 Castellan of Wojnice (1535–1542), 
 Governor of Sandomierz (1542–1552) and Lelow (1533–1552). 
 owner of the village of Kraśnik where he built a wooden church and a hospital for the poor. In 1541 he granted the town a fair day.

He died on 21 May 1553 and is buried in Krasnik.

References

Polish nobility